Tetanolita mynesalis, the smoky tetanolita, is a litter moth of the family Erebidae. The species was first described by Francis Walker in 1859. It is found in eastern North America.

The wingspan is 20–25 mm. Adults are on wing from May to November.

Larvae probably feed on dead leaves.

Subspecies
Tetanolita mynesalis mynesalis
Tetanolita mynesalis inaequalis Ferguson, Hilburn & Wright, 1991 (Bermuda)

References

Herminiinae
Moths of North America
Moths described in 1859